New Amsterdam is an unincorporated community located in the town of Holland, in La Crosse County, Wisconsin, United States.

History
86 original Dutch settlers settled the area in 1853. The town steadily expanded in the 1850s, seeing a post office in 1855 and its first town hall meeting in 1858.

Notes

Dutch-American culture in Wisconsin
Unincorporated communities in La Crosse County, Wisconsin
Unincorporated communities in Wisconsin